Willis S. Arnold (March 2, 1851 – January 17, 1899) was an American professional baseball player who played as an outfielder in two games of the  1872 season for the Middletown Mansfields in the National Association.

He later served as president of the New York State League and managed the Albany Senators for part of the 1885 season.

References

External links

1851 births
1899 deaths
Major League Baseball outfielders
19th-century baseball players
Middletown Mansfields players
Baseball players from Connecticut
Minor league baseball managers
Auburn (minor league baseball) players
Sportspeople from Middletown, Connecticut
Burials at Albany Rural Cemetery